Brain Research UK, formerly known as the Brain Research Trust, is a United Kingdom medical research charity dedicated to the research of neurological diseases and conditions.

Registered charity no. 1137560

About

Founded in 1971 to support research at University College London's Institute of Neurology, Queen Square, London, the charity now funds UK-wide and focuses on those conditions where they determine funding is most urgently needed - currently brain tumours, brain and spinal cord injury, and headache and facial pain.

References

External links
 Official site

Health charities in the United Kingdom
Neurology organizations
Organisations based in the City of London